The Wall Street station is a station on the IRT Broadway–Seventh Avenue Line of the New York City Subway, located at the intersection of Wall Street and William Street in the Financial District of Manhattan. It is served by the 2 train at all times and the 3 train at all times except late nights.

History 

The Wall Street station was built on the portion of the IRT Broadway–Seventh Avenue Line built as part of the Dual Contracts, which is the section south of Times Square–42nd Street. The line first opened as a shuttle to 34th Street–Penn Station on June 3, 1917. The line was extended south to South Ferry on July 1, 1918; the Wall Street station opened on the same date, and was the southern terminus of a shuttle on the line's Brooklyn Branch to Chambers Street. On August 1, 1918, the new "H" system was implemented on August 1, 1918, joining the two halves of the Broadway–Seventh Avenue Line and sending all West Side trains south from Times Square. As a result, shuttle service to this station was replaced by through service. This station was the line's terminus until April 15, 1919, when the Clark Street Tunnel opened, allowing service to run to Brooklyn.

The city government took over the IRT's operations on June 12, 1940. During the 1964–1965 fiscal year, the platforms at Wall Street, along with those at four other stations on the Broadway–Seventh Avenue Line, were lengthened to 525 feet to accommodate a ten-car train of 51-foot IRT cars.

In 1995, as a result of service reductions, the MTA was considering permanently closing one of the two Wall Street stations, as well as two other stations citywide, due to their proximity to each other. Either the IRT Broadway–Seventh Avenue Line station or the IRT Lexington Avenue Line station would have been closed.

Station layout

This underground station is the southernmost in Manhattan on the Brooklyn Branch of the Broadway–Seventh Avenue Line. South of here, the line travels under the East River via the Clark Street Tunnel to Brooklyn Heights. The single island platform is between the two tracks, and is very narrow compared to other stations in system. It has blue I-beam columns and dark blue floors tiles. The walls by the tracks have small "W" tablets on a mosaic trim except at the north end, where they have "WALL ST" written in black letters on white tablets over a green trim line. This is where the platform was extended in 1964–1965.

There is a narrow full-length mezzanine above the platform that has mosaics pointing to, and connecting, all four station entrances.

Exits 

This station has four sets of entrances/exits. The first exit is at the northern end of the station. It has a customer assistance booth with a bank of turnstiles and long passageway to a set of doors leading to the basement of 28 Liberty Street. A wide staircase leads to an entrance/exit at the east side of Nassau Street at Cedar Street. This entrance is only open on weekdays and also provides access to the Broad Street station and the Wall Street/Broadway station.

The second exit, also open weekdays only, contains a bank of turnstiles and passageway to a spiral staircase that leads to Pine Street outside 60 Wall Street. The passageway has an artwork called Subway Wall by Harry Roseman made in 1990 and installed after a 1993 station renovation. This exit also has a set of doors to two escalators and a double-wide staircase that go up to the public atrium lobby of 60 Wall Street. This entrance has two red globes and overhead signs, giving the impression of an outdoor station entrance built in the lobby.

The third exit was the original entrance to the station and is staffed full-time. It has a bank of turnstiles and staircases to both northern corners of William and Wall Streets. The entrance at the northeast corner, outside 48 Wall Street, is made of ornate metal and has a sign reading "Interborough Rapid Transit Co-to All Trains."

The last exit is at the south end of the station, which leads to the same intersection as the third exit but is in a separate fare control area. A single double-wide staircase from the platform leads to two HEET turnstiles and two regular turnstiles. Staircases lead to both southern corners of William and Wall Streets; the southeastern corner exit is outside 55 Wall Street. This exit, though open at all times, is unstaffed as there is no token booth.

A fifth exit, which led to the southwestern corner of Pine Street and William Street, was closed after April 1992. An exit to the northeast corner of the same intersection was removed and slabbed over in 1948. The northeast-corner exit had been closed by 1944. Exits also existed to the northwest and southeast corners of the same intersection until some point after 1944.

Image gallery

References

External links 

 
 nycsubway.org – Subway Wall Artwork by Harry Roseman (1990)
 MTA's Arts For Transit – Wall Street (IRT Broadway–Seventh Avenue Line)

Wall Street
IRT Broadway–Seventh Avenue Line stations
New York City Subway stations in Manhattan
Railway stations in the United States opened in 1918
1918 establishments in New York City
Financial District, Manhattan